
Gmina Giby is a rural gmina (administrative district) in Sejny County, Podlaskie Voivodeship, in north-eastern Poland, on the border with Belarus and Lithuania.

Villages

Gmina Giby contains the villages and settlements of Aleksiejówka, Baraki, Białogóry, Białorzeczka, Białowierśnie, Budwieć, Chylinki, Czarna Hańcza, Daniłowce, Dworczysko, Dziemianówka, Frącki, Gibasówka, Giby, Głęboka Biel, Głęboki Bród, Gulbin, Iwanówka, Karolin, Konstantynówka, Krasne, Kukle, Lipowo, Muły, Okółek, Pogorzelec, Pomorze, Posejnele, Rygol, Sarnetki, Stanowisko, Studziany Las, Szlamy, Tartaczysko, Wielki Bór, Wierśnie, Wiłkokuk, Wronie Góry, Wysoki Most and Zelwa.

Neighbouring gminas
Gmina Giby is bordered by the gminas of Krasnopol, Nowinka, Płaska and Sejny. It also borders Belarus and Lithuania.

References
 Polish official population figures 2006

Giby
Sejny County